The WCW World Television Championship was a professional wrestling television championship owned by the now-defunct World Championship Wrestling (WCW) promotion.

The title was created in 1974 by Mid-Atlantic Championship Wrestling (MACW) as a secondary title. Initially known as the Mid-Atlantic Television Championship, as Mid-Atlantic (later known as Jim Crockett Promotions) grew, the title became known as the NWA World Television Championship and in 1991 as the WCW World TV Championship.

The title was often defended in matches with a time limit of ten or fifteen minutes. More often than with other championships, title matches resulted in time limit draws and the champion retaining the title. This was often used as a heat-building device to allow a villain champion to retain his title. The NWA version of the belt had the logos of the major television networks in the U.S. (NBC, CBS, and ABC) on either side of the belt, while the 1992–1995 WCW version of the belt  had TBS on both sides of the belt.

Tully Blanchard had the longest World Television Championship reign, holding the title for 353 days. Booker T had the most reigns as World Television Champion, with six. Arn Anderson holds the record for most days as champion, with 870 over four title reigns. The last champion was Jim Duggan, who claimed the title while working as the WCW janitor after Scott Hall threw it in the garbage and he found it in a dumpster. The title was retired on April 10, 2000, after the Vince Russo-Eric Bischoff WCW reboot.

Reigns

References 

National Wrestling Alliance championships
Television wrestling championships
World Championship Wrestling championships